Il Gavark Rural District, or Gawerk,  is in the Central District of Bukan County, West Azerbaijan province, Iran. At the National Census of 2006, its population was 5,798 in 919 households. There were 5,179 inhabitants in 1,207 households at the following census of 2011. At the most recent census of 2016, the population of the rural district was 4,596 in 1,266 households. The largest of its 25 villages was Golulan-e Sofla, with 402 people. The rural district is the homeland of the Gavark tribe.

References 

Bukan County

Rural Districts of West Azerbaijan Province

Populated places in West Azerbaijan Province

Populated places in Bukan County